The CAF Confederation Cup, known as the TotalEnergies CAF Confederation Cup for sponsorship purposes, is an annual association football club competition established in 2004 from a merger of the CAF Cup and the African Cup Winners' Cup and organized by CAF.

Clubs qualify for the competition based on their performance in their national leagues and cup competitions. It is the second-tier competition of African club football, ranking below the CAF Champions League. The winner of the tournament faces the winner of the aforementioned competition in the following season's CAF Super Cup.

Moroccan clubs have the highest number of victories (7 titles), followed by Tunisia with 5. Morocco have the largest number of winning teams, with five clubs from each having won the title. The competition has been won by 13 clubs, 5 of which have won it more than once. CS Sfaxien is the most successful club in the competition's history, having won the tournament a record 3 times. RS Berkane are the current defending champions, having beaten Orlando Pirates by penalties in the 2022 Final.

History

2004–2017: Beginnings, Tunisian dominance 
In 2004, CAF merged the African Cup Winners' Cup created in 1975 with the CAF Cup introduced in 1992 to form a new competition called the Confederation Cup, which has since been considered the second African club competition.

In the first edition, the Ghanaian club Hearts of Oak won the edition by beating another Ghanaian club, Asante Kotoko in the final on Penalties. The following year, Moroccan club AS FAR won the cup against Nigeria's Dolphin FC. In 2006, Tunisian club ES Sahel won the cup against Moroccan AS FAR (thanks to the away goals rule).

The Tunisian club CS Sfaxien won the cup in 2007 by beating the Sudanese Al Merreikh 5 goals to 2 in aggregate score (4-2, 1-0). The following season, CS Sfaxien again won the cup against another Tunisian club, ES Sahel. In 2009, Stade Malien won the edition by beating the Algerian club ES Sétif in the final, on penalties. The following season, the Moroccan club Fath Union Sport won the cup against Tunisian CS Sfaxien, winning the return match 3 to 2.

In 2011, Moroccan club Maghreb Fès defeated Tunisia's Club Africain in the final, on penalties. The following year, Congolese club AC Léopards beat Malian club Djoliba AC in the final. The 2013 edition saw CS Sfaxien win against Congolese TP Mazembe. In 2014, the Egyptian club Al Ahly SC obtained its first confederation cup by beating the Ivorian club Séwé FC. In 2015, ES Sahel again won the cup by beating South African club Orlando Pirates. TP Mazembe achieved the double in 2016 and 2017, beating Algerian club MO Béjaïa and South African SuperSport United respectively.

2018–present: Moroccan dominance 
Moroccan club Raja CA won in 2018 against Congolese AS Vita Club. In 2019, Zamalek SC beat Moroccan RS Berkane in the final, on Penalties.

In 2020 in the context of the Covid-19 pandemic, the matches were then played behind closed doors, the Moroccan club RS Berkane beat the Egyptians of Pyramids FC by the score of 1 to 0. Since this season, the final has been played in a single game. In 2021, the Moroccan club Raja CA won the cup for the second time by beating JS Kabylie in the final with a score of 2 to 1.

In 2022, Moroccan club RS Berkane won the cup for the second time, beating South African club Orlando Pirates in the final on penalties.

Qualification
The competition is composed of domestic cup winners from all 54 CAF member associations and the third-placed-finished club in the domestic leagues of the top twelve-ranked associations discounting/excluding the present year/season.

Format
The competition is played into two phases; the qualification phase and the main phase.

Qualification phase
The competition begins with a preliminary round and then a first qualifying round played in a "trim-down" knock-out format with the away goals rule serving as tiebreakers. The sixteen teams eliminated from the first qualifying round of the CAF Champions League enter the second qualifying round of this competition, unless they are eliminated from there as well.

Main phase
 The sixteen winning teams from the second qualifying round enter the group stage divided into four groups of four. Each team will play against the other three opponents in a round-robin system three points for a win.
 The group winners and runners-up qualify to a two-legged knock-out rounds which shall be played in two matches, home and away in three rounds (quarter-finals, semi-finals and the finals).
 In case of equality in the number of goals scored during the two matches, the team scoring the greatest number of away goals will be declared winner. If the number of goals scored on the away matches is equal, kicks from the penalty mark will be taken.

The Super Cup
The winners will face the CAF Champions League winners in the CAF Super Cup the following season on the former's home venue.

Sponsorship 
In October 2004, MTN contracted a four-year deal to sponsor CAF's competitions worth US$12.5 million, which at that time was the biggest sponsorship deal in African sporting history.

In 2008, CAF put a value of €100 million for a comprehensive and long-term package of its competitions when it opened tenders for a new sponsor, which was scooped up by French telecommunications giant Orange through the signing of an eight-year deal in July the following year, whose terms were not disclosed.

On 21 July 2016, French energy and petroleum giant Total S.A. (renamed TotalEnergies in 2021) secured an eight-year sponsorship package from CAF to sponsor its competitions, beginning with its flagship competition, the Africa Cup of Nations.

Current Sponsors:

Prizes

Trophy and medals 

Each year, the winning team is presented with the African Champion Clubs' Cup, the current version of which has been awarded since the competition name change in 1997. Forty gold medals are presented to the competition winners and 40 silver medals to the runners-up.

2009–2020
CAF increased the prize money to be shared between the top 16 clubs.

Note: National Associations receive an additional equivalent share of 5% for each amount awarded to clubs.

Broadcast coverage
Below are the current broadcast rights holders of this competition:

Records and statistics

All-time top scorers

Finals

Performances

Overall winners

Overall performances by country

Champions by region

See also

 CAF Champions League
 CAF Women's Champions League
 CAF Super Cup
 CAF Cup
 African Cup Winners' Cup

References

External links

CAF Confederation Cup on RSSSF

 
Confederation of African Football club competitions